Spodocybe is a genus of mushrooms in the family Hygrophoraceae. Spodo- means grey and -cybe means head, referring to the grey pileus of the known species. At least two species were formerly classified as species of Clitocybe, as they are clitocyboid mushrooms, bearing a superficial resemblance in morphology to the genus.

Description
Small, clitocyboid mushrooms. Grey, convex pileus, applanate to infundibuliform, center becoming depressed with age. White to cream, deeply decurrent gills, often running significantly down the stem. Stipe central, not quite cylindrical, the same or similarly-colored as the cap. Inamyloid, smooth, thin-walled, ellipsoid, hyaline, colorless spores. Clamp connections abundant in all parts of the mushroom.

Ecology and distribution
Saprophytic, gregarious (growing in sparse clusters), or caespitose (growing in dense clusters) in coniferous or mixed forest.

Species
Spodocybe bispora 
Spodocybe collina 
Spodocybe fontqueri 
Spodocybe herbarum 
Spodocybe rugosiceps 
Spodocybe trulliformis

References

External links
 Spodocybe at Faces of Fungi.org
 Spodocybe at Index Fungorum.org
 Spodocybe at MycoBank.org

Hygrophoraceae
Agaricales genera